This is the list of episodes for the NBC crime drama television series Crossing Jordan. It was broadcast from September 24, 2001 to May 16, 2007 and was created by Tim Kring.  It stars Jill Hennessy as Dr. Jordan Cavanaugh, a crime-solving forensic pathologist employed in the Massachusetts Office of the Chief Medical Examiner. In addition to Jordan, the show followed an ensemble cast composed of Jordan's co-workers and police detectives assigned to the various cases.

Series overview

Episodes

Season 1 (2001–02)

Season 2 (2002–03)

Season 3 (2004)
Following the conclusion of the second season, Crossing Jordan went on hiatus to accommodate lead actress Jill Hennessy's pregnancy. As a result, the third season was delayed until March 2004 and shortened to 13 episodes, many of which aired out of chronological order.

Season 4 (2004–05)

Season 5 (2005–06)

Season 6 (2007)

References

External links
  at NBC.com
 

Lists of American crime drama television series episodes